Kuwait International Airport is an international airport located in the Farwaniya Governorate, Kuwait,  south of the centre of Kuwait City, spread over an area of . It serves as the primary hub for Kuwait Airways and Jazeera Airways. A portion of the airport complex is designated as Abdullah Al-Mubarak Air Base, which contains the headquarters of the Kuwait Air Force, as well as the Kuwait Air Force Museum.

History
The airport was first launched in 1927–1928. It was originally envisioned as a stop for British planes on their way to British India. The current main airport structure, designed by Kenzo Tange and opened in 1979, was executed and completed by Al Hani Construction in a joint venture with Ballast Nedam of The Netherlands.

On February 27, 1991, during the final days of the Gulf War, in part of the liberation of Kuwait, the airport became the scene of a tank battle between Iraqi forces and elements of the U.S. Army Special Forces.

The airport underwent a large renovation and expansion project from 1999 to 2001, in which the former parking lot was cleared and a terminal expansion was built. This incorporated new check-in areas, a new entrance to the airport, the construction of a multi-story parking structure and an airport mall.

Kuwait International Airport can currently handle more than 13 million passengers a year. A new general aviation terminal was completed in 2008 under a BOT scheme and is operated by Royal Aviation. By the end of 2008, however, this airport was modified with the construction of a small building named the Sheikh Saad General Aviation Terminal, to handle the scheduled services of Wataniya Airways along with general aviation traffic.

In 2011, the Department of Civil Aviation announced the intention of extending Kuwait International Airport so it can handle more passengers and more aircraft. On October 3, 2011, the Directorate General of Civil Aviation announced that a new Foster + Partners designed terminal will begin construction in 2012 and will increase the annual passenger handling amount to 14 million passengers in its first phase with the option of expanding to 25 million passengers. The airport finalized formalities for the construction of the terminal, which was due to begin construction in 2012 with completion by 2016. It would be built to the south of the current terminal complex with new access routes from the Seventh Ring Road to the south of the airport compound. It is designed as a three-pointed star, with each point extending 600 meters from the star's center. Two airside hotels will form part of the new building.

In December 2012, the Kuwaiti Ministry of Public Works announced that the new Terminal at the Kuwait International Airport would be completed by the end of 2016, estimating the cost to be around 900 million Kuwaiti dinar ($3.2 billion). On May 20, 2013, the Director of Operations Management in the General Administration of Civil Aviation, Essam Al-Zamil, announced that some of the flights will be diverted to the Sheikh Saad Terminal instead of Kuwait Airport's main terminal starting in July due to the large number of passengers and the growing number of aircraft attributing to Kuwait Airport being over capacity.

On May 9, 2017, the Foster + Partners designed Terminal 2 formally broke ground and heavy construction work began on site. The terminal is being built by Turkey's Limak Holding and was originally scheduled for completion in 6.5 years, although the contractors and Kuwaiti government have made claims to deliver the project within four years.

On May 22, 2018, Jazeera Airways launched its own dedicated terminal at Kuwait International Airport, to be called Terminal 5. It is located directly adjacent to and connected to the existing main building, but features dedicated arrival/departure areas, customs and all supporting functions in order to alleviate congestion at the main building. All Jazeera arrivals will arrive at the new terminal from opening, while departing flights will transition from the current terminal between May 22 and May 27. By May 27, all departing and arriving Jazeera flights will be handled exclusively at Terminal 5.

On August 8, 2018, Terminal 4 was inaugurated to cater to all flights operated by Kuwait's national carrier, Kuwait Airways. Terminal 4 can handle 4.5 million passengers annually and eases congestion at Terminal 1. There are 2,450 additional car parking spaces in a dedicated surface lot adjacent to the terminal and connected to the building by a bridge.

From 13 March to 1 August 2020, all commercial flights at Kuwait International
Airport were suspended as a result of the COVID-19 pandemic.

Military
The airport is home to the Abdullah Al-Mubarak Air Base, which is used by the Kuwait Air Force and has been used by Italian Air Force Boeing KC-767s since October 2014 for the fight against ISIL. The gateway at Abdullah Al-Mubarak Air Base, used by US Air Force and coalition forces, was replaced after over 20 years of operation in 2019 with the opening of Cargo City, located adjacent to a newly built ramp on the airport's western side. Cargo City is operated by the 387th Air Expeditionary Group, with the 5th Expeditionary Air Mobility Squadron providing additional services like maintenance for military and contract flights.

Facilities

Terminals

Kuwait International Airport will have five operational, numbered terminals by 2023 or 2024.

Terminal 1
Terminal 1, designed by Kenzo Tange, is the primary building at Kuwait International Airport and houses most arriving and departing flights other than those operated by Jazeera Airways, Kuwait Airways, Aegean Airlines and flydubai, which operate out of the other terminals; it has 16 gates. The terminal also houses restaurants, duty-free shops, security checkpoints, and four lounges.

Terminal 2
Terminal 2, designed by Foster and Partners, will expand the airport's overall capacity by 25–50 million passengers per year through the introduction of a triangular building with 28 gates, 4,500 additional parking spaces and a 400-bed air-side hotel. It began construction in May 2017 and was due for completion in August 2022, but got shifted to 2024 due to the COVID-19 pandemic. The new terminal is environmentally sustainable. It is one of the world's largest environment friendly airport projects. It is an essential part of Kuwait Vision 2035.

Terminal 3
Originally named the Sheikh Saad General Aviation Terminal and conceived for use by private aircraft, Terminal 3 is a small building that was used exclusively by Aegean Airlines and flydubai before being shut down due to work in Terminal 2.

Terminal 4

Inaugurated on 8 August 2018, Terminal 4 is used by all flights operated by Kuwait's national carrier, Kuwait Airways. The building was designed by the Spanish branch of the American company AECOM and built by a joint venture between Cengiz Insaat and First Kuwaiti Contractor. It is housed in a dedicated building neighboring the cargo-handling facilities on the airport compound and built over an area of 55,000 square meters. It offers five bus gates and nine boarding bridges gates, with a capacity of eight planes at the same time. Terminal 4 can handle 4.5 million passengers annually and eases congestion at Terminal 1. There are 2,450 additional car parking spaces in a dedicated surface lot adjacent to the terminal and connected to the building by a bridge.

Terminal 5
Inaugurated in May 2018, Terminal 5 is exclusively used by Kuwait-based budget airline Jazeera Airways. Attached to Terminal 1 but with dedicated entrance/exit points, it also includes check-in zones, security checkpoints, lounges, shops, three departure gates, customs and arrival belts. It additionally offers 350 parking spaces in a multi-story facility attached to Terminal 5 by a bridge.

Terminal assignments

Airlines and destinations

Passenger
The following airlines offer scheduled passenger service.

Cargo

Statistics

Accidents and incidents
 On 25 August 1973, Douglas DC-6 belonging to Yemen Airlines was hijacked during a flight from Taiz to Asmara. After making a refueling stop in Djibouti, the aircraft was taken to Kuwait where the single hijacker surrendered.
 On 17 December 1973, a terrorist attack on Rome's Fiumicino Airport ended with the hijacking of a Lufthansa Boeing 737-100 that was preparing to depart to Munich. The aircraft was taken to Kuwait where the hijackers surrendered one day later.
 On 5 June 1977,  a Middle East Airlines Boeing 707 was hijacked during a flight from Beirut to Baghdad. The ordeal ended in Kuwait when the aircraft was stormed and the single hijacker was arrested.
 On 24 July 1980, two hijackers demanding money surrendered after hijacking a Kuwait Airways Boeing 737-200 during a flight from Beirut.
 On 12 December 1983, the airport was one of the targets of the 1983 Kuwait bombings.
 In December 1984, Kuwait Airways flight 221, an Airbus A310-200 with 166 people on board operating Kuwait-Dubai-Karachi was hijacked to Tehran by five armed gunmen, demanding release of some prisoners involved in attacks on foreign interests in Kuwait.
 On 2 August 1990, British Airways Flight 149 carrying 349 passengers landed at Kuwait International Airport just four hours after the Iraqi invasion of Kuwait, leading to the capture of the passengers and crew. The Boeing 747-100 aircraft was looted by the Iraqis and destroyed. All passengers and crew were reported safe, but one flight attendant was raped and the passengers were taken to Iraq. A McDonnell Douglas DC-9 belonging to the Kuwait Air Force was also destroyed in the airport. During the Iraqi invasion of Kuwait many of the planes belonging to Kuwait Airways were stolen from the airport and stored in different locations in Iraq, some of the Airbus A310s notably were given Iraqi registrations, the aircraft were later destroyed by allied bombings in 1991.
 On 25 February 1991, USMC McDonnell Douglas AV-8B Harrier II crash-landed after being hit by ground fire during the Kuwait Liberation War.
 On 27 February 1991, the airport played host to a large tank battle between U.S. and Iraqi forces during the first Gulf War. It is known today as the Battle of Kuwait International Airport.
 On 10 December 1999, three US military personnel died when a USAF Lockheed C-130 Hercules made a hard emergency landing at Kuwait International Airport after sustaining damage from landing short of the runway at nearby Jaber al-Ahmad Airbase.
 On 12 March 2007, a Lebanese-registered Saab 340A corporate aircraft owned by First Kuwaiti Trading & Contracting was badly damaged when it struck vehicles while taxiing.
 On 6 January 2014, disgruntled passengers on board a Turkish Airlines aircraft attacked cabin crew and opened aircraft door to prevent the aircraft from returning to Istanbul after it was diverted to Kuwait due to bad weather at original destination Basra.
 On 28 January 2014, a FlyNAS aircraft wrongly entered a construction area while taxiing, which led to leaving paved surface and getting stuck in sand.
 On 12 June 2017, a Kuwait Airways Airbus A320 aircraft was minorly damaged when the tow bar broke while it was being pushed back causing the tow tractor to get stuck under the aircraft.
 On 27 August 2017, a Jazeera Airways Airbus A320 aircraft on approach at the end of a flight from Riyadh hit a tethered military blimp in a restricted area north of the airport, causing apparent damage to one of the engines.
 On 24 May 2018, a Police Air Wing Eurocopter AS365 Dauphin helicopter was destroyed in fire that broke out in a military hangar. Another similar helicopter was rescued before the fire reaches it.
 On 4 December 2018, an Air France Airbus A340-300 made an emergency landing in Kuwait while en route from Paris to Mumbai due to smoke in the cabin.
On 7 May 2019, a towing tractor driver was killed when a Kuwait Airways Boeing 777-300ER aircraft being towed rolled over the tractor after the tow-bar broke.

References

External links

Kuwait International Airport (official site) 
 
 
 

Airports established in 1962
Airports in Kuwait
Buildings and structures in Kuwait City
1962 establishments in Kuwait